Lust for Blood is the eleventh original album by electro-industrial band Velvet Acid Christ. The album's promotional single is titled Wound, which was on the Deutsche Alternative Chart for 8 weeks and reached number 10 on Billboards Hot Dance Singles Sales in 2006.

Track listing
Wound
Parasite
Discolored Eyes
Crushed
Disconnected Nightmare
Polyester Meth Zeus
Kashmir Crack Krishna
Ghost in the Circuit
Machine
Lust
For
Blood
Psychoaktive Landscapes
Ghost Regen

References

2006 albums
Velvet Acid Christ albums